LDLC ASVEL Féminin (formerly Lyon Basket féminin and FC Lyon Basket féminin) is a French women's basketball club from the Lyon suburb Villeurbanne.  LDLC is a French e-commerce company (founded by Laurent de la Clergerie) that sponsors the club.  ASVEL stands for Association Sportive de Villeurbanne Éveil Lyonnais, an acronym combining ASV and EL (Lyon Awakening) that merged into one club.  LDLC ASVEL is the men's basketball team owned by the same ASVEL multi-sport company.

Honours
 Ligue Féminine
 Winners (1): 2019
 French Cup
 Winners (1): 1960
 Match des Champions
 Winners (1): 2019
 Challenge round
 Winners (1): 2014
 National 1 (French 3rd division)
 Winners (1): 2009

Current roster

Famous players
  Rebecca Allen 
  Julie Vanloo 
  Sandrine Gruda 
  Audrey Sauret 
  Geraldine Robert 
  Milica Dabovic 
  Haley Peters
  Alysha Clark

References

Women's basketball teams in France
Women's basketball